Uesugi (sometimes written Uyesugi) is a Japanese surname. Notable people with the surname include:

People
Uesugi clan, a Japanese samurai clan
Uesugi Akisada, (1454–1510), a samurai of the Uesugi clan
Uesugi Harunori (1751–1822), a Japanese daimyō
Uesugi Kagekatsu (1556–1623), a daimyō during the Sengoku and Edo periods of Japanese history
Uesugi Kagenobu (?–1578), a samurai and relative of Uesugi Kenshin in the Sengoku period of Japan
Uesugi Kagetora (1552–1579), the seventh son of Hōjō Ujiyasu and adopted son of Uesugi Kenshin
Uesugi Kenshin (1530–1578), a daimyō who ruled Echigo province in the Sengoku period of Japan
Uesugi Mochinori (1844–1919), a Japanese samurai of the late Edo period
Uesugi Narinori, (1820–1889), a Japanese daimyō of the Edo period
Uesugi Norimasa (1523–1579), a daimyō of feudal Japan
Uesugi Norizane, (1410–1466), a Japanese samurai of the Uesugi clan
Uesugi Tomooki, (1488–1537), a lord of Edo Castle and enemy of the Hōjō clan during the Sengoku period of Japan
Uesugi Tsunakatsu, (1639–1664), a Japanese daimyō of the Edo period
Uesugi Zenshū (unknown-1417), the chief advisor to Ashikaga Mochiuji, an enemy of the Ashikaga shogunate in feudal Japan
Takashi Uesugi (born 1968), a Japanese freelance journalist
Teppei Uesugi (born 1985), a Japanese football (soccer) player for Thespa Kusatsu
Takeo Uesugi (born 1940), a Japanese-American landscape architect known for his garden designs

Fictional characters
Kazuya Uesugi and Tatsuya Uesugi from the anime and manga series Touch
Tatsuha Uesugi, from the anime and manga series, Gravitation
Futaro Uesugi, the male protagonist of the anime and manga series The Quintessential Quintuplets

Japanese-language surnames